The Kubusi River is a river near Stutterheim in the Eastern Cape Province of South Africa.

Dams
 Wriggleswade Dam

See also
 List of rivers in South Africa

References 

Rivers of the Eastern Cape